4 in Love may refer to:

4 in Love (group), a girl group from Taiwan
4 in Love (album), an album by Cookies, a girl group from Hong Kong
4 in Love (TV series), a Hong Kong TVB series starring Moses Chan and Charmaine Sheh